King's Norton Boys' School is a secondary school for around 650 pupils aged 11 to 16. It is located in Northfield Road in Kings Norton within the formal district of Northfield near the centre of the city of Birmingham, England. It is situated east of the A441, just north of the B4121 in Cotteridge.

History
It was founded as a boys' grammar school in the reign of King Edward VI, circa 1550.  It was refounded in 1912.  In the 1960s, when administered by the City of Birmingham Education Committee, it had around 600 boys. It became a boy's comprehensive school in 1975.  The grammar school's had five houses in the 1960s, but they amalgamated to only four houses in the 1980/90s. It was announced that the sixth form center at Kings Norton boys school would close following the 2017–2018 school year and the year 7 intake increased to 150 students.

Curriculum
Pupils follow a broad curriculum that includes National Curriculum core subjects to GCSE and A-Level.
The school was designated a Sixth Form Specialist Science College in 2004, and a collaborative scheme exists for sharing 6th form resources with Kings Norton Girls' School.

An October 2017 Ofsted report classed the school as 'Good'

Notable former pupils
 Richard Blaze, rugby player
 Robert Flello, Labour MP from 2005–17 for Stoke-on-Trent South
 Adrian Goldberg radio & TV presenter/reporter
 Edward J Mason, radio, television and film scriptwriter
 Caryl Phillips, writer, Professor of English
 Alan Smith, footballer, TV football pundit

King's Norton Grammar School for Boys

 Arthur Bywater, the only civilian to have been awarded the GC and the GM
 Roxbee Cox, Baron Kings Norton, chancellor from 1969–97 of Cranfield University, and aeronautical engineer
 Doug Hele, motorcycle engineer
 Sir Julian Horn-Smith, chief operating officer from 2001–04 of Vodafone and member of Vodafone's founding management
 Stuart Linnell, radio & TV presenter, Radio Hallam, Mercia Sound, BBC Local Radio, BBC West Midlands television, & former reporter for Sky Sports News
 Bob Mills, comedian, actor, radio presenter and former TV personality
 Enoch Powell (briefly), Financial Secretary to the Treasury 1957–58, Minister of Health 1960–63, Shadow Secretary of State for Defence 1965–68
 Leslie Seymour, Conservative MP from 1959–64 for Birmingham Sparkbrook
 Chris Skudder, sports presenter/correspondent Sky News & Sky Sports News

See also
 List of English and Welsh endowed schools (19th century)

References

External links
 EduBase

Secondary schools in Birmingham, West Midlands
Educational institutions established in 1912
1912 establishments in England
Foundation schools in Birmingham, West Midlands